Samah Khaled (born 1 May 1992) is a Jordanian racing cyclist. She competed in the 2013 UCI women's road race and time trial in Florence. She also competed at the 2014 Asian Games.

For the 2021 season, Khaled will join the Dubai Police team for its first season at UCI level.

Major results
2020
 1st Stage 2 Dubai Women's Tour

References

External links

1992 births
Living people
Jordanian female cyclists
Place of birth missing (living people)
Cyclists at the 2014 Asian Games
Asian Games competitors for Jordan